The 2020–21 UConn Huskies women's basketball team represented the University of Connecticut (UConn) during the 2020–21 NCAA Division I women's basketball season. The Huskies, led by Hall of Fame head coach Geno Auriemma in his 36th season at UConn, split their home games between Harry A. Gampel Pavilion and the XL Center and were members of the Big East Conference, which they joined for women's basketball that season. UConn was previously a member of the original Big East Conference from 1979 through 2013, and one of the original women's basketball teams of that league in 1982.

UConn was ranked no. 3 in both the AP and Coaches pre-season polls. During the regular season, they had a record of 21–1, including 18–0 in the Big East to win the conference regular season championship. In February 2021, they defeated no. 1 ranked South Carolina; it was UConn freshman Paige Bueckers' third straight 30-point game. UConn won the Big East tournament, winning all three of their games by over 30 points. They were ranked no. 1 in both polls at that time. As a no. 1 seed in the NCAA tournament, they won their region with a victory over no. 5 ranked Baylor in the Elite Eight. UConn then lost to Arizona in the Final Four and finished their campaign with a record of 28–2. Bueckers, the team's leading scorer, won several awards at the end of the season, including the Naismith College Player of the Year.

Offseason

Departures

Recruits

Recruiting class of 2021

Recruiting class of 2022

Roster

Saylor Poffenbarger was only on the roster for the spring semester, joining the team in January.

Schedule

|-
!colspan=12 style=""| Regular season

|-
!colspan=12 style=|Big East Women's Tournament

|-
!colspan=9 style="|NCAA tournament

Rankings

^ Coaches did not release a Week 2 poll

Player statistics

Awards and honors
 Paige Bueckers
 Naismith Player of the Year
 United States Basketball Writers Association Player of the Year
 Associated Press Player of the Year
 John R. Wooden Award
 Nancy Lieberman Award
 Associated Press first-team All-American
 United States Basketball Writers Association first-team All-American
 Women's Basketball Coaches Association All-American
 United States Basketball Writers Association Co-Freshman of the Year
 Women's Basketball Coaches Association Co-Freshman of the Year
 Big East Player of the Year
 First-team All-Big East
 Big East Freshman of the Year
 Big East All-Freshman Team
 Big East tournament Most Outstanding Player

 Olivia Nelson-Ododa
 Big East Co-Defensive Player of the Year
 Second-team All-Big East

 Aaliyah Edwards
 Big East Sixth Woman of the Year
 Big East All-Freshman Team

 Christyn Williams
 First-team All-Big East

 Geno Auriemma
 Big East Coach of the Year

See also
2020–21 UConn Huskies men's basketball team

References

UConn Huskies women's basketball seasons
NCAA Division I women's basketball tournament Final Four seasons
Connecticut
Connecticut
Connecticut
Connecticut